Ernst Platner (11 June 1744 – 27 December 1818) was a German anthropologist, physician and Rationalist philosopher, born in Leipzig. He was the father of painter Ernst Zacharias Platner (1773–1855).

Life
Following the death of his father in 1747, the philologist Johann August Ernesti became his foster father. He received his early education at the gymnasium in Altenburg, the Thomasschule in Leipzig and at the gymnasium in Gera. Afterwards, he studied at the University of Leipzig, where in 1770 he became an associate professor of medicine. Later at Leipzig, he was appointed a full professor of physiology (1780) and philosophy (1811). In 1783/84 and 1789/90 he served as university rector.

Work
Platner was a follower of the teachings of Leibniz. He was the author of Anthropologie für Aerzte und Weltweise, one of the more important anthropological works of the Spätaufklärung (an epoch of German literature). This work was influential to scholars that included Johann Gottfried Herder, Friedrich Schiller and Karl Philipp Moritz. He believed in treating modern anthropology as a medical-philosophical science of the whole individual — a viewpoint that can be considered as a precursor of psychosomatic medicine.

Platner is credited with originally coining the term Unbewußtseyn (unconscious). He is also credited for coining the phrase "pragmatic history of the human faculty of cognition" (pragmatische Geschichte des menschlichen Erkentnißvermogens), later appropriated by Johann Gottlieb Fichte as "pragmatic history of the human spirit" (pragmatische Geschichte des menschlichen Geistes).

Selected publications 
 Anthropologie für Aerzte und Weltweise (Anthropology for physicians and the worldwise), 1772 
 Neue Anthropologie für Aerzte und Weltweise (New anthropology for physicians and the worldwise), 1790 
 Über den Atheismus. Ein Gespräch (About atheism, an interview), 1783 
 Philosophische Aphorismen nebst einigen Anleitungen zur philosophischen Geschichte (Philosophical aphorisms with some principles for a history of philosophy), Vol. 1: 1776, Vol. 2: 1782
 Quaestiones physiologicae (Questions of physiology), 1794 
 Quaestiones medicinae forensis (Questions of forensic medicine), 1797–1817

Notes

References 
 This article incorporates translated text from an article at the German Wikipedia, whose sources include: Plat(t)ner, Ernst at NDB/ADB Deutsche Biographie.

German anthropologists
German philosophers
Physicians from Leipzig
Academic staff of Leipzig University
Rectors of Leipzig University
1744 births
1818 deaths
German male writers